Elections to Restormel Borough Council were held on 1 May 2003.  The whole council was up for election with boundary changes since the last election in 1999 increasing the number of seats by one. The council stayed under no overall control.

Results

|}

Two Independents and one Liberal Democrat councillor were elected unopposed.

By ward

References

2003 English local elections
2003
2000s  in Cornwall